John Van Voorst (1804–1898) was an English publisher of natural history books. His publications were noted for their good quality, reasonable prices and the frequent inclusion of superior illustrations by notable artists.

Biography 
John Van Voorst was born in Highgate on 15 February 1804, to a family of Dutch descent. He served a six-year apprenticeship in Wakefield from the age of 16 before returning to London to work for publishers Longman, Green, Orme, Hurst & Co. He set up his own business in Paternoster Row in 1833. Initially, he published illustrated reprints, including Gray's Elegy in a Country Church-Yard and Goldsmith's Vicar of Wakefield, but he soon began to specialise in natural history books, often illustrated, and was appointed bookseller to the Zoological Society in 1837.

Some of his most noted publications were British Fishes (by Yarrell, 1835), British Quadrupeds (by Bell, 1836), British Birds (by Yarrell, 1837). With the exception of Darwin, Voorst worked with most of the noted naturalists of his day including Alfred Russel Wallace, Philip Henry Gosse, George Johnston, Edward Forbes, Edward Newman and Richard Owen. The illustrators he employed were equally notable, including such artists as John Constable, William Mulready, Richard Westall, Edwin Landseer, and Copley Fielding. In 1871 his list of current titles comprised 224 books or learned journals, the majority covering topics in natural history.

Van Voorst published the journal The Zoologist, for more than forty years, starting in January 1843, until 1886.

He also published several children's books, including the anonymously published works of author and sanitary reformer Anne Bullar. He retired in 1886, his assistants taking over as Gurney and Jackson.

He was a founder member of the Royal Microscopical Society in 1839, and became a Fellow of the Linnean Society in 1853.

Sources

References

Publishers (people) from London
British naturalists
1804 births
1898 deaths
Fellows of the Linnean Society of London
Fellows of the Royal Microscopical Society
People from Highgate
19th-century English businesspeople